Coe Township is located in Rock Island County, Illinois. As of the 2010 census, its population was 1,657 and it contained 659 housing units.  Coe Township originally was named Fremont Township, but changed its name to Penn Township on October 1, 1857. Then changed its name from Penn to Coe in January, 1858.

Geography

Demographics

References

External links
City-data.com
Illinois State Archives
Coe Township Website 

Townships in Rock Island County, Illinois
Townships in Illinois
1858 establishments in Illinois
Populated places established in 1858